Ottayal Pattalam is a 1991 Indian Malayalam-language Caper comedy film written and directed by T. K. Rajeev Kumar. The film stars Mukesh and Madhoo, with Innocent
and KPAC Lalitha in the supporting roles. Sharreth scored the music for the film.

Plot

Venu is an orphan who works as a taxi driver. He is mistaken by the police for the kidnapper of Gopika Varma, an NRI girl. Venu tries to solve his problems and prove his innocence and meanwhile stay out of sight of police, by pretending to be a retired Colonel. Amidst his efforts to prove his innocence, he falls in love with Gopika. When she finds he is innocent and gets to know everything had happened without his knowledge, she also starts loving him. How Venu proves that he is innocent is the rest of the plot. The true kidnapper turns out to be an African.

Cast
 Mukesh as Venu Gopalakrishnan/Col. R. K. Nair
 Madhoo as Gopika Varma/Indu
 Innocent as DIG Chandrashekara Menon
 KPAC Lalitha as SI Shoshamma
 Shammi Thilakan
 Antony (Kenyan) as Simon Antony
 Paravoor Bharathan as SI
 Vettukili Prakash as Velayudhan
 Edavela Babu
 Kalpana
 Bobby Kottarakkara as Makeup man
 Preethika
 Ranju
 Ravi Vallathol
 Asha Jayaram
 James
 Manimala as Matron

Soundtrack 

The film has two songs composed by Sharreth, while the lyrics were penned by P. K. Gopi. The song "Mayamanchalil" is an Evergreen song. The background score of the movie was by Johnson.

References

External links
 

1990s Malayalam-language films
Films directed by T. K. Rajeev Kumar
Films scored by Sharreth